Madam Garsa Fwip, or simply Madam Garsa, is a fictional character in the Disney+ Star Wars television series The Book of Boba Fett. A Twi'lek cantina owner, she is introduced in the 2021 series premiere "Chapter 1: Stranger in a Strange Land". Appearing in three episodes overall, she brings her tribute and loyalty to Boba Fett following the death of Jabba the Hutt by filling his helmet with gold, which he refuses. When former gladiator Black Krrsantan is fighting the Trandoshans she tries to calm him, but fails. She is killed in the 2022 penultimate episode "Chapter 6: From the Desert Comes a Stranger", after the Pykes blow up The Sanctuary while she is inside.

Madam Garsa is portrayed by Jennifer Beals, who also co-designed the character with costume designer Shawna Trpcic. In spite of her limited screen-time, Madam Garsa has received generally positive reviews from critics.

Appearances 
Madam Garsa Fwip is the Twi'lek owner of the cantina The Sanctuary in the city Mos Espa on Tatooine. When Boba Fett becomes the new Daimyo of Tatooine, Madam Garsa Fwip's cantina is watched over by him. As Fett and his partner Fennec Shand start to settle in, both of them come to pay a visit to The Sanctuary to tell Madam Garsa that her business will thrive under their watch. While they are there, Madam Garsa has two of her servants polish their helmets and fill Fett's with coins, giving tribute to him as the new Daimyo. After Fett and Shand leave the cantina, they are attacked by Night Wind assassins, but are able to defend themselves. Later, when the Hutt Twins arrive in Tatooine, Madam Garsa explains that the Twins are Jabba the Hutt's cousins, who have come to take back Jabba's land from Fett. The Twins try to intimidate Fett with a Wookiee named Black Krrsantan, but Fett does not comply.

Once the Hutt Twins leave the planet after failing to take back the land, Black Krrsantan decides to stay in Tatooine and visits The Sanctuary. While there, he sees Trandoshans, who are known for hunting Wookiees, gambling, and attacks them. He is shortly calmed down by Madam Garsa, who reminds him of his past as a gladiator, telling him that he does not need to prove anything. Black Krrsantan then ignores her and rips off one of the arms of the Trandoshans. Madam Garsa tells Black Krrsantan that he needs to pay for the damage he caused, and he takes some credits from one of the Trandoshans, giving them to Madam Garsa. After watching the whole thing happen, Fett hires Krrsantan as his bodyguard.

As tension between Fett and the Pykes, who are selling spice throughout the city, rises, the Pykes send two of their kind to The Sanctuary. Madam Garsa notices them and has two of her servants attend to them, but the Pykes reject their help and leave a container of credits on a table, without having a drink. As a droid tries to remind them that they left their container, the container blows up the cantina, subsequently killing Madam Garsa. After the bombing, Fett states that war has begun and uses the remains of The Sanctuary as cover against the Pykes.

Characteristics 
Madam Garsa Fwip is a tan-skinned Twi'lek, which are humanoids that have two lekku, tentacular-like tails on the back of their heads. Since they are considered attractive, Twi'lek women are often depicted as slaves, especially to the Hutt family, but Madam Garsa is a wealthy owner of a cantina. Actress Jennifer Beals, who portrayed Madam Garsa Fwip throughout The Book of Boba Fett, stated that "I mean, Madam Garsa is extraordinary. She is not like any other Twi'lek we've seen. She's enormously wealthy. And the costumes are extraordinary... it's clear that she's no one's slave and that she's no one's master. That is why she's a madam... They have actual plants on a planet where water comes at a premium. That's how wealthy she is."

Development

Portrayal 

Madam Garsa Fwip is portrayed by Jennifer Beals, who had previously worked with Jon Favreau, creator of the series, in Mrs. Parker and the Vicious Circle and Robert Rodriguez, one of the directors of the show, in Four Rooms. Beals' agent told her that Jon Favreau wanted to talk to her about giving her a part in The Mandalorian, but Favreau was trying to keep a secret and was talking about The Book of Boba Fett. She later video chatted with Dave Filoni and Robert Rodriguez, and they told her what her character was going to be like. Beals and Robert Rodriguez discussed how Madam Garsa was like Rick Blain from the film Casablanca.

Later, she said that she got the part when her brother had just told her about the show The Mandalorian and later received a phone call telling her she got the part. After getting hired, she said that she binge-watched The Mandalorian. Beals said that when she arrived on set, she had no clue what show she was part of, but said that she knew it was Star Wars, which she admitted she did not know much about, and that her character was a Twi'lek who owned a cantina. Madam Garsa was originally going to be called master, but Beals did not think that was a good idea as Madam Garsa is trying to create a "literal sanctuary of beauty and balance in a world that’s lacking both", so they called Madam Garsa by that title. Beals was working on The L Word: Generation Q while she was also working on The Book of Boba Fett. She said that it was two different experiences.

Costume 
Beals helped incorporate many of the designs on Madam Garsa Fwip and the costumes she wears. Shawna Trpcic, costume designer for The Book of Boba Fett, talked to Beals about meditation and told her that if she ever had any thoughts about the character's design to tell her about them so she could integrate the ideas into Madam Garsa's costume. Because Beals thought that no one could come out of a battle unharmed, the scar that goes from Madam Garsa's collarbone to her sternum was Beals' idea. One of Madam Garsa's costumes was designed as Madam Garsa's version of a cat eye, which Beals called a nod to a "recognizable sign of beauty, status, health, and makeup". They based the eye makeup off Egyptian lineage.

Madam Garsa's lekku were made by Brian Sipe and Alexei Dmitriew, who made sure it balanced and fit perfectly on Beals' head. They made them by measuring Beals' head to see where the most weight would be and how it would affect her spine. After measuring her head, they took pictures of her and made a 3-D rendition of the lekku on their computer. The makeup artist Alexy Jukic-Prévost made stencils for the eye makeup to quickly apply the makeup after each episode. Beals said that the makeup for The Book of Boba Fett took less time than for The L Word: Generation Q.

Reception 
Madam Garsa Flip has been received positively by critics, despite her minor role in the series. Screen Rant ranked her the 10th best supporting character in The Book of Boba Fett. /Film has put her at the 10th best character in the series, stating, "Jennifer Beals was sadly not given that much to do with her Twi'lek nightclub owner, but what we get of her was promising." Comicbook's Jamie Jirak was excited to see Beals as Madam Garsa, saying that fans were also pleased to see Beals in a Star Wars streaming television series. Hannah Flint, writer at IGN, was disappointed in Beals' casting as what ultimately proved to be a minor character and "cameo", writing that it "amounts to nothing".

References

External links 
 
 

Female characters in television
Fictional bartenders
Fictional businesspeople
Fictional humanoids
Fictional murdered people
Television characters introduced in 2021
The Book of Boba Fett characters